Lieutenant General   Joseph  Shimweelao Shikongo (born 18 September 1964) is  the Inspector General of  Namibian Police Force. He was appointed by President Hage Geingob on the 22 August 2022, Shikongo resume his duty officially on the 1 September 2022. Shikongo is replacing the retired Lieutenant General Sebastian Ndeitunga.

Early life 
Shikongo joined the armed struggle at the tender age of 14 in 1979, because of his age Shikongo could not go through a military  training. He was instead sent to Kwanza Sul in Angola and later transferred to Nyango in Zambia for his studies.   In 1983 is only when Shikongo received his military training in war tactics and military  skills at Tobias Hainyeko Military Training Center. Shikongo is Specialised  in  Anti Air Defence Operations

Career 
Lieutenant General Shikongo early career begin in 1984 with his deployment at 2nd  Mechanised Brigade  and subsequently appointed as AD Battery Political Commissar. At independence in 1990 Shikongo was integrated into a new formed Namibian Defence Force, he joined with a Lance Corporal rank,  he later promoted to the rank of Sergeant. In 1994 Shikongo raised to the rank of Staff Sergeant to a Lieutenant rank in 1998. Shikongo Joined Namibian Police Force in 2000 with rank of Inspector. He was later  assign to the Prime Minister's office as Chief  of Security from 2000 - 2003 , he was letter transferred to a Very Important Person Protection Directorate. In 2004 Shikongo was transferred form VIPP Directorate to serve at Wanahenda Police Station in the Crime Investigation unit and in 2005 he was appointed as Staff Officer to Deputy Inspector General of Operations. Shikongo from rank of Deputy Commissioner  he was appointed in 2019  to severed as a Police Commissioner for Khomas Region.   In 1 April 2021 Lieutenant General Shikogo Was appointed by then Inspector General Sebastain Ndeitunga as Major General as well as Deputy Inspector General of operations. In 22 August 2022 Shikongo was Appointed as Inspector General Of Namibian Police.

Apart from the national assignments Shikongo had also been assigned international assignments where he serve in peace keeping mission in Sudan, Democratic Republic of Congo and at United Nation in New York.

References 

Namibian police officers
Living people
1964 births